Neville Sylvester Neil (17 March 1917 – 22 May 2009) was a bishop of the Moravian Church in Jamaica.

Biography
Bishop Neil was born in Dunder Hill, a village in St Elizabeth, Jamaica. He attended school first at Lititz Elementary School and then St Andrew Tutorial College. His theological training was at St Colme's (then in Kingston), from where he graduated in 1944.

He served the Moravian Church in Jamaica for more than 50 years, first as a clergy man and from 1983 as a bishop. He retired in 1993. The congregations for which he was responsible during those years include Redeemer and New Beulah.

He was married with children, one of whom is also a Moravian Church clergyman.

Bishop Neil is buried at Bethabara Moravian Church (aerial view).

References

1917 births
2009 deaths
Jamaican bishops
Jamaican people of the Moravian Church
Bishops of the Moravian Church
20th-century bishops
People from Saint Elizabeth Parish